Gary Lynn Harris (born 1953) was a professor of electrical engineering at Howard University and director of that school's National Nanotechnology Infrastructure Network facility. His research involved semiconductor fabrication of electronic and optical materials. He was one of the first two African Americans to receive a Ph.D. in electrical engineering from Cornell University, along with Michael Spencer.

Life
Gary Lynn Harris received a B.S. in 1975, and an M.S. in 1976, for electrical engineering. From 1977 to 1980, he was an associate with the National Research and Resource Facility for Sumicron Structures (NRRFSS). From 1981 to 1982, he was a visiting scientist at the Naval Research Laboratory. In 1980 he became an associate professor at Howard University. In 1984 he became a consultant to the Lawrence Livermore National Laboratory. Harris remained a professor of electrical engineering at Howard University.  He directed the school's National Nanotechnology Infrastructure Network node, one of 14 in the nation.  He was Dean of the Graduate School and Associate Provost for Research at Howard. Dr. Gary Harris died on Monday, October 26, 2020.

Notable works

References

1953 births
Living people
American electrical engineers
Cornell University College of Engineering alumni
Howard University faculty